This is a list of people who have served as Lord Lieutenant of Moray, Scotland. Until 1928 the office was known as Lord Lieutenant of the County of Elgin.

Lord Lieutenants of Elginshire
Francis Stuart, 9th Earl of Moray 17 March 1794 – 28 August 1810
Francis Stuart, 10th Earl of Moray 6 September 1810 – 12 January 1848
Gen. Hon. Sir Alexander Duff 14 February 1848 – 21 March 1851
James Duff 21 May 1851 – 1856
George Skene Duff 9 April 1856 – 1872 (resigned) 
Alexander Duff, 1st Duke of Fife 1 January 1872 – July 1902 (resigned)
Charles Henry Gordon-Lennox, 7th Duke of Richmond 27 August 1902 – 18 January 1928

Lord Lieutenants of Moray
Charles Henry Gordon-Lennox, 8th Duke of Richmond 14 March 1928 – 7 May 1935
Francis Douglas Stuart, 18th Earl of Moray 2 August 1935 – 9 July 1943
Brig Sir Henry Houldsworth 28 September 1943 – 9 October 1963
Sir Iain Tennant 16 January 1964 – 1994
AVM George Arthur Chesworth 21 April 1994 – 2005
Lt-Col. Grenville Johnston 20 August 2005 – 28 January 2020
Maj Gen Seymour Monro 2020 – present

Deputy lieutenants
A deputy lieutenant of Elgin was commissioned by the Lord Lieutenant of Elgin. Deputy lieutenants support the work of the lord-lieutenant. There can be several deputy lieutenants at any time, depending on the population of the county. Their appointment does not terminate with the changing of the lord-lieutenant, but they usually retire at age 75.

19th Century
17 May 1848: Sir John Macpherson Grant, 
17 May 1848: James Campbell Brodie, Esq.
17 May 1848: George Skene Duff, Esq.
17 May 1848: John Lewis Ricardo, Esq.
17 May 1848: Henry Inglis, Esq.
17 May 1848: Alexander Thomas Wharton Duff, Esq.

References

External links
Moray Lieutenancy

Moray
Moray
 
Elginshire